Eden Mill Nature Center is a nature center in Pylesville, Marland, United States.

History
The center was a gristmill in the 1800s. The name comes from Father Eden.

In 1917, it was made into a power plant by remodeling the dam, as it continued to function as a mill until 1964. In 1991, Harford County purchased the center with the purpose of converting it into a park.

References

Nature centers in Maryland
Museums in Harford County, Maryland
Mill museums in Maryland
Protected areas of Harford County, Maryland
Natural history museums in Maryland